The Djambi class''' was a class of steam corvettes of the Royal Netherlands Navy. The class comprised Djambi, Zoutman, Willem, Leeuwarden, Metalen Kruis and Curaçao. Later two ships of a supposedly 'slightly revised' type were built, the Zilveren Kruis-class corvettes.

Dutch Naval Plans in the 1850s

 Plan 1855 
The Dutch naval plan 1855 called for a screw corvette of 250 hp as standard fighting warship for the East Indies. The steam corvettes of the Groningen class were the first of this type. They were designated as 'Steamships second class'. The Djambis were meant to supplement the number of these 'Steamships second class'.

 Corvettes and armored ships 
Even before the first of the Djambi class was launched, the whole class became technically obsolete when the French ironclad Gloire entered service in August 1860. The Djambis could not damage armored ships, and were slower than most of them. For service in the colonies however, many nations continued to use (and build) wooden corvettes.

 Dutch rating system 
When the first Djambis were ordered, they were designated as 'screw steamships first class'. When the lead ship Djambi was launched it was a 'screw steamships second class'. Still later they were again designated as '(Screw) Steamship first class'. This had to do with the Dutch rating system. In 1858 the Dutch navy had: ships of the line in two classes; frigates in two classes; corvettes in two classes etc. They kind of doubled this system for steamships, having 3 frigates with auxiliary power (45-51), 2 corvettes with steampower (19), 3 screw steamships of the second class, 5 screw steamships of the 4th class. For Steam paddlers there were also 4 classes. 

The change in designation of the Djambi class had to do with this rating system. In the sailing age the Dutch had corvettes that had their guns below the upper deck ('kuilkorvet'), and corvettes that had their battery on the upper deck. The classification of the Djambi'''s (with their guns on the upper deck) as steam ships of the second class left room for a 'Steamship first class'. Later on two wooden ships of the Anna Paulowna-class would actually be laid down as 'Steamship first class'. 

Design

Apart from the Dutch artificial classification in screw steamships of a certain class, the Dutch also spoke about ships in terms of actual type. This happened e.g. during the discussions about the 1862 naval budget. At the same the Djambis were designated as corvettes, and in particular as flush deck corvettes. While they were laid down in 1859-1860 Leeuwarden and Curaçao were referred to as 'Steam Corvettes'.

In all probability the design of the Djambi class was based on the experience gained with the preceding corvette class which included Groningen, Vice Admiraal Koopman and Citadel van Antwerpen. The Djambi class was two meters longer and 1-1.5 meter wider. That is, they were about 10-14% wider.

At the time the Dutch built the Djambi England built the slightly larger corvette HMS Orpheus of the Jason class.

Propulsion

The Djambi class had machines of 250 nominal horsepower, which was the same as that of the preceding corvette class. When the Dutch shifted to using indicated horse power, the machines were measured at 700 indicated horse power. The difference is due to nominal horse power not taking steam pressure into account. Therefore indicated horse power is a better measure. 

The machines for Djambi were made by Fijenoord, the shipyard of the NSBM in Rotterdam, and tried in April 1861. The machines for two other early ships of the class were made by Van Vlissingen en Dudok van Heel in Amsterdam.

In August 1862 Zoutman made a trial course on the Nieuwediep that was deemed 'satisfactory'. She attained a speed of 8-8.5 knots. In an 1875 overview all existing ships of the class were said to attain 8.5 knots maximum. The earlier English corvette HMS Pearl of about equal size made 11.3 knots, but had 400 nominal and 1324 ihp, almost double the effective power.

Armament

 Rifled and Smooth Bore muzzle loaders 
The Djambis carried a mix of rifled muzzle loaders of 16 cm caliber (RML) and smooth-bore muzzle loaders (SBML) of 16 cm caliber, known as long 30 pounders. Both cannon had a caliber of 16 cm, but the more modern rifled gun fired a cylindrical object and the smooth bore gun fired a traditional circular bullet of 30 pounds. With the invention of the rifled gun, nations switched from using bullet weight for classification of their guns, to using 'bullet' diameter. The rifled gun was designated by its diameter, because it could fire an object of arbitrary weight. On the contrary the weight of the shot of the traditional smooth-bore gun could be derived directly from its bore.

Rifled gun 16 cm No. 3 

The rifled gun used on the Djambi's was the RML 16 cm No. 3, introduced in 1862. It was the first attempt to produce a large caliber rifled gun for the Dutch navy. The gun was made by converting old  bronze carronades by filling them up and reboring them. The guns were soon known to be almost completely ineffective against armored ships. This was not such a problem for the Djambi'''s, because they were not meant to fight armored ships.

Initially HNLMS Djambi, lead ship of the class and Zoutman, had only 4 RML 16cm No.3 and 12 smooth bore 30-pounders. Later each of the Djambi's was armed with 8 rifled muzzle loaders of 16 cm caliber and 8 smooth-bore muzzle loaders of 16 cm caliber. Still later, Leeuwarden and Curaçao had lost their old smooth-bore 30-pounders, and each had 16 rifled 16 cm guns. Probably from the by then retired Zoutman and Willem. 

 Long 30-pounder No. 4 
The classic smooth bore gun was the long 30-pounder No.4, at least that's what Metalen Kruis had in 1880 The 30 pdr long No. 4 had been introduced in 1853 and had a barrel length of 3.19 meter. This was longer than the 30-pounder long No. 2 found in the previous corvettes, which was only 2.77 long. 

There were rumors that with her beam of 12.25 meter Djambi was too narrow to properly operate all the guns. The 'problem' was probably caused by the smooth-bore guns. Djambi was about 50 cm wider on each side than the previous class, and so the increased barrel length of (3.19-2.77) 42 cm should not have been a problem. However, that does not help if all kinds of obstacles are placed on the extra space.

Ships in the class

Of the 6 ships 4 were built at the Rijkswerf'' in Amsterdam and 2 (Leeuwarden, Curaçao) at the Rijkswerf in Vlissingen.

References

Notes

External links

Corvettes of the Royal Netherlands Navy
19th-century naval ships of the Netherlands
Ship types